Ahmed Magdy Saad Mohamed (born 9 December 1989) is an Egyptian footballer, who plays for El Gouna FC and the Egypt national team as a winger or attacking midfielder. He played for Egypt at the 2012 Summer Olympics.

References

External links
 

1989 births
Living people
Egyptian footballers
Egypt international footballers
Association football midfielders
2011 CAF U-23 Championship players
Olympic footballers of Egypt
Footballers at the 2012 Summer Olympics
Ghazl El Mahalla SC players
Smouha SC players
Wadi Degla SC players
El Gouna FC players
El Entag El Harby SC players
Al-Wehda Club (Mecca) players
Zamalek SC players
Misr Lel Makkasa SC players
Saudi Professional League players
Expatriate footballers in Saudi Arabia
Egyptian Premier League players
People from Gharbia Governorate
Association football wingers
Association football fullbacks